Ceredigion and Pembroke North was a county constituency in southwestern Wales which elected one MP via the first past the post electoral system. It was located in the preserved county of Dyfed.

Boundaries 
The constituency had the same boundaries for its entire lifetime, and consisted of Ceredigion and an area of northern Pembrokeshire around the towns of Newport and Fishguard. It was created in 1983, and abolished again at the next review of electoral boundaries in 1997.

Under proposed changes announced in September 2016, the constituency would be recreated with a somewhat larger area, and also including a small area of western Montgomeryshire.

Electoral history 
The Liberals' Geraint Howells was the seat's first MP, having also held the predecessor Cardigan seat for 9 years. He was elected in both 1983 and 1987 with a comparatively low vote share compared to most other constituencies. In 1992, however, Plaid Cymru jumped from fourth to first place in one of that election's biggest upsets. Cynog Dafis was its MP thereafter, and then transferred to Ceredigion after the seat's abolition.

The area was considered to be a swing seat between Plaid Cymru and the Liberal Democrats.

Members of Parliament

Elections

Elections in the 1980s

Elections in the 1990s

See also 
Ceredigion (Assembly constituency)
List of parliamentary constituencies in Dyfed
List of parliamentary constituencies in Wales

References 

Historic parliamentary constituencies in Wales